Bingabing is a common name for several plants and may refer to:

Macaranga grandifolia, endemic to the Philippines
Macaranga mappa